Arcuș is a commune in Covasna County, Transylvania, Romania. Composed of a single village, Arcuș, it became an independent commune when it split from Valea Crișului in 2004. Arcuș previously formed part of the Székely Land region of the historical Transylvania province.

Demographics

The commune has a Székely Hungarian majority. According to the 2011 census, it has a population of 1,527 of which 96.2% or 1,469 are Hungarian.

References

Communes in Covasna County
Localities in Transylvania